Wen Yong Yang is an assistant men's track & field coach at Rice University in Houston, Texas.  Coach Yang is one of the world's foremost competitors in the jumping events (high jump, long jump, and triple jump).

Yang began his career in the Chinese national sports system, serving as national coach from 1982 to 1986, during the inaugural 1983 World Championships in Athletics and the 1984 Summer Olympics.  His star pupil, Zhu Jianhua, set three consecutive world records in the high jump from 1983 to 1984, and won the bronze medal at the Los Angeles games.

Since immigrating to the United States in 1986, Yang has become one of the nation's top collegiate coaches, guiding his pupils to three NCAA championships, 29 NCAA All-American awards, and 25 conference titles.  Yang's athletes hold every school record in the jumps, including Kareem Streete-Thompson's outdoor long jump mark of 8.63 metres, which ranks him #8 all-time in the event.

References
Wen Yong Yang Profile from Rice Owls

American people of Chinese descent
Living people
Rice Owls track and field coaches
Year of birth missing (living people)